KTRI may refer to:

 Tri-Cities Regional Airport (ICAO code KTRI)
 KCKH, a radio station (95.9 FM) licensed to serve Mansfield, Missouri, United States, which held the call sign KTRI-FM from 1978 to 2018